Snow White The Power of Dwarfs is a 2014 Chinese animated comedy fantasy adventure film directed by Adam Qiu. It was released on August 21, 2014.

Cast (Mandarin)
Chen Qing

Cast (English)
Ash Gordey as Plucky and Doby
Ron Hendricks as Fire Wizard
Sarah Jane Pot as The Queen

Music
Songs 'I Will Find' and 'We Will Never Be Afraid' Composed by Ridwan Amir and Robert Chua Go

Reception
It has earned US$2.78 million at the Chinese box office.

References

External links

2014 animated films
2014 films
2010s adventure comedy films
2010s fantasy comedy films
Animated adventure films
Animated comedy films
Chinese animated fantasy films
2014 comedy films